Kindred Motes-Caso (born April 23, 1990) is an American philanthropist, he is a founder and director of KM Strategies Group (KMSG).

Career
He represented the organization at the Global Summit to end sexual violence, co-chaired by Angelina Jolie and UK Foreign Secretary William Hague.

In October 2015, he was appointed as a communications manager and UN ECOSOC representative at Control Arms. In the following year, he joined MacArthur Foundation as the head of the digital communications, safety, and justice challenge. In 2016, Motes-Caso served on the Young Leaders Board of Robert F. Kennedy Human Rights.
In the same year, he joined the Vera Institute of Justice as a digital community manager and was later promoted to digital strategy director in 2017.

Motes-Caso served on the American Civil Liberties Union (ACLU)

Achievements
Motes-Caso was given the Outstanding Young Alumnus Award by Birmingham-Southern College in 2019.

References

1990 births
Living people
People from Alabama
People from Somerville, Massachusetts
21st-century American philanthropists
21st-century American businesspeople
American philanthropists